The Battle of Manresa and Battle of Vilafranca from 21 March to 5 April 1810 saw a Spanish division led by Juan Caro and Luis González Torres de Navarra, Marquess of Campoverde attack an Imperial French brigade commanded by François Xavier de Schwarz.

Background
Caro's division first surprised the town of Vilafranca del Penedès in March and captured its 800-man garrison made up of troops from the Confederation of the Rhine.

Battle
The Spanish troops remained at large and fell upon the town of Manresa at the beginning of April. After several days of sparring they drove Schwarz and his German soldiers out of the town with heavy losses. Caro was wounded on 2 April and was replaced by Campoverde. The Spanish force included 2,000 regulars, 2,300 local  miquelets (Catalan Militia), and Francesc Rovira i Sala's band of 3,000 miquelets. This minor disaster caused Marshal Pierre Augereau to call off Imperial troops which were threatening Tarragona. Schwarz's brigade belonged to Marie François Rouyer's division while Caro's division was part of Henry O'Donnell's Army of Catalonia. The actions occurred during the Peninsular War, part of the Napoleonic Wars.

References

External links
 

Battles of the Peninsular War
Battles of the Napoleonic Wars
Battles in Catalonia
Battles involving Spain
Battles involving France
Conflicts in 1810
March 1810 events
April 1810 events